The Youth of Sunna Forces or Sunni Youth Forces, formerly the Youth of Sunna Division and the Youth of Sunna Brigade, was a Syrian rebel group affiliated with the Free Syrian Army's Southern Front that was armed with U.S.-made BGM-71 TOW anti-tank missiles. It operated in the Daraa and Quneitra Governorates until it surrendered and later joined ranks of Syrian Arab Army in 2018.

History
On 2 August 2016, fighters from the Youth of Sunna Forces raided the house of its deputy leader Mohammad Tohme and proceeded to beat his father and shot his brother. In response, the next day Tohme loyalists stormed its own headquarters in Bosra and deposed Ahmad al-Auda, the leader of the group. Auda and his followers fled and was subsequently placed under house arrest, while the military council handed over the group's command to Tohme and his deputy, Bilal Droubi. Some rebel supporters called this a coup d'etat while others declared their support and defended the toppling of corrupt leaders.

On 22 August 2016, additional Southern Front factions joined the Youth of Sunna Division under the new leadership of Colonel Nassim Abu Ezza.
In 2018 after major rebel defeat in southern Syria, the group surrendered to the government forces and later joined ranks of SAA, supporting offensive against ISIS affiliate Jaish Al Walid in July 2018.

Groups
Hamza Division
Zaidi Cavalry Division
Houran Brigade
Caliph Umar ibn Abd al-Aziz Brigade
Spears of Alwali Brigade
Martyr Yousef the Great Brigade
Martyr Ahmed al-Khalaf Brigade
Zaidi Knights Brigade
Shield of Lajat Brigade
Abu Saddam Brigade
Martyr Ahmed al-Miqdad
Banner of the Martyrs of Bosra
Martyr Abdul Razzaq Azaaba Brigade
Martyr Zuhair al-Zoubi Brigade
Martyr Akhawsh Brigade
Descendants of Ali Brigade
Martyr Obeida Alissa Brigade
Medical Battalion
Mujahideen Houran
Inkhil Martyrs Brigade

War crimes

On 28 February 2016, the diplomat for the town of Abtaa, Colonel Zidan Nsierat, was disappeared into a prison in Bosra held by the Youth of Sunna Brigade. Three days later, he was killed being tortured in the prison, and the group refused to hand over his corpse to his family. Similar incidents of deaths due to prisoner abuse by the Youth of Sunna was reported in the town.

See also
List of armed groups in the Syrian Civil War

References

Anti-government factions of the Syrian civil war
Anti-ISIL factions in Syria
Free Syrian Army